Amberdeep Singh is an Indian actor, director, screenwriter and producer associated with Punjabi films.

Life and career
Singh did his schooling at Government Senior Secondary School in Abohar and then studied B. Com at DAV College, Abohar. After that he pursued a master's degree in Theatre and television from Punjabi University, Patiala before moving to Mumbai in 2001. His father is a journalist. Singh in an interview disclosed he went to become an actor and ended up writing dialogues and scripts for comedy shows. He has worked in Comedy Nights with Kapil and Comedy Circus for a long time. He has won 5 awards for his direction, screenwriting and stories. In 2015, he won the best screenplay award at PTC Punjabi Film Awards for writing the screenplay of Goreyan Nu Daffa Karo. In 2016, he won 2 awards for Angrej including best screenplay and best story. In 2018, he won Best Debut Director award at Filmfare Punjabi Awards and Best Director Award at PTC Film Awards for his directorial debut Lahoriye.

He has also played cameo appearances in films Love Punjab, Sarvann, Lahoriye, Harjeeta and Ashke.  He made his debut as a lead actor in Laung Laachi opposite to Neeru Bajwa followed by Bhajjo Veero Ve in 2018.

Filmography

References

External links 
 

1979 births
Living people
Indian male screenwriters
Punjabi-language film directors
Screenwriters from Punjab, India